The 2013 Samsung Securities Cup was a professional tennis tournament played on hard courts. It was the 14th edition of the men's tournament which was part of the 2013 ATP Challenger Tour and the third edition of the women's event, which was part of the 2013 ITF Women's Circuit. It took place in Seoul, South Korea, on 28 October–3 November 2013.

Men's singles main draw entrants

Seeds 

 1 Rankings as of 21 October 2013

Other entrants 
The following players received wildcards into the singles main draw:
  Chung Hyeon
  Lee Duck-hee
  Nam Ji-sung
  Kim Young-seok

The following player received entry with a Protected Ranking:
  Daniel Kosakowski

The following players received entry from the qualifying draw:
  Sergey Betov
  Yuichi Ito
  Toshihide Matsui
  Yang Tsung-hua

Women's singles main draw entrants

Seeds 

 1 Rankings as of 21 October 2013

Other entrants 
The following players received wildcards into the singles main draw:
  Han Sung-hee
  Kang Seo-kyung
  Lee Hwa
  Yu Min-hwa

The following players received entry from the qualifying draw:
  Choi Ji-hee
  Rika Fujiwara
  Hong Seung-yeon
  Jeong Yeong-won
  Kim Da-hye
  Kim So-jung
  Kim Sun-jung
  Zhu Lin

Champions

Men's singles 

  Dušan Lajović def.  Julian Reister by Walkover

Women's singles 

  Han Na-lae def.  Kim Da-hye 6–4, 6–4

Men's doubles 

  Marin Draganja /  Mate Pavić def.  Lee Hsin-han /  Peng Hsien-yin 7–5, 6–2

Women's doubles 

  Han Na-lae /  Yoo Mi def.  Kim Sun-jung /  Yu Min-hwa 2–6, 6–3, [10–6]

2013 ATP Challenger Tour
2013 ITF Women's Circuit
2013
Samsung